Notocrater youngi is a species of small sea snail, a marine gastropod mollusk in the family Pseudococculinidae, the false limpets.

Distribution
This species occurs in the Atlantic Ocean off the Bahamas; and at the Caribbean coast of Colombia.

Description 
The maximum recorded shell length is 3.14 mm.

Habitat 
Minimum recorded depth is 70 m. Maximum recorded depth is 518 m.

References

External links
 To Biodiversity Heritage Library (1 publication)
 To USNM Invertebrate Zoology Mollusca Collection

Pseudococculinidae
Gastropods described in 1995